Li Haowen (Chinese: 李浩文; born 29 November 1993 in  Shanghai) is a Chinese football player who currently plays for China League One side Suzhou Dongwu.

Club career
Li Haowen started his professional football career in 2011 when he was loaned to Shanghai Zobon's squad for the 2011 China League Two campaign. He joined Chinese Super League's newcomer Shanghai Dongya in 2013. He eventually made his league debut for Shanghai on 26 April 2014 in a game against Shanghai Shenhua, coming on as a substitute for Tobias Hysén in the 69th minute. On 28 May 2014, he scored his first goal for Shanghai Dongya in a 1–0 home win over Harbin Yiteng.
In March 2017, Li was loaned to League Two side Suzhou Dongwu until 31 December 2017. He was sent to the Shanghai SIPG U23 team in 2018.

Career statistics 
Statistics accurate as of match played 31 December 2020.

References

External links
 

1993 births
Living people
Chinese footballers
Footballers from Shanghai
Pudong Zobon players
Shanghai Port F.C. players
Suzhou Dongwu F.C. players
Chinese Super League players
China League One players
China League Two players
Association football forwards